Thomas Whittle may refer to:

 Thomas Whittle (martyr) (died 1556), English Protestant martyr
 Thomas Whittle (poet) (1683–1736), Tyneside poet/songwriter, artist and eccentric
 Thomas Whittle the Elder (1803–1887), English landscape and still life artist
 Thomas Levi Whittle (1812–1868), early Mormon pioneer